Alf Olsen may refer to:
 Alf Olsen (footballer) (1893–1976), Danish amateur football player
 Alf Olsen (gymnast) (1925–2001), Norwegian gymnast
 Alf Gowart Olsen (1912–1972), Norwegian ship owner and ship broker